The Daughter of Mehemed (German: Die Tochter des Mehemed) was a 1919 German silent film directed by Alfred Halm and starring Ellen Richter, Emil Jannings and Harry Liedtke.

The film's art direction was by Kurt Richter.

Cast
 Ellen Richter as Leila, Mehemeds Tochter
 Emil Jannings as Vaco Juan Riberda, Fabrikbesitzer 
 Harry Liedtke as Dr. Jan van Zuylen, Geologe 
 Fred Immler as Alinzo Diaz, Bankdirektor  
 Max Kronert as Mehemed, alter Schuhmacher  
 Lotte Davis as Frau Diaz  
 Emilie Kurz as Biskra, sein Weib  
 Albert Patry as Minister

References

Bibliography
 Grange, William. Cultural Chronicle of the Weimar Republic. Scarecrow Press, 2008.

External links

1919 films
UFA GmbH films
Films of the Weimar Republic
Films directed by Alfred Halm
German silent feature films
German black-and-white films
1910s German films